Fermín Donazar (11 January 1933 – 27 September 2018) was a Uruguayan athlete. He competed in the men's long jump at the 1956 Summer Olympics and the 1960 Summer Olympics.

References

External links
 

1933 births
2018 deaths
Athletes (track and field) at the 1955 Pan American Games
Athletes (track and field) at the 1956 Summer Olympics
Athletes (track and field) at the 1960 Summer Olympics
Uruguayan male long jumpers
Olympic athletes of Uruguay
Place of birth missing
Pan American Games competitors for Uruguay